This is a list of towns and villages in Tajikistan. Cities with a population greater than 10,000 can be found at the list of cities in Tajikistan.

Villages in Tajikistan

A

 Abdusamad
 Alga
 Alichur
 Alowmayn
 Amondara
 Andarsoy
 Anzob
 Arabkishlak
 Artuch
 Askalon
 Ayni, Ayni District
 Ayni, Varzob District

Top of page

B

 Bahori
 Baljuvon
 Basmanda
 Bedak
 Bidev
 Bobodarkhon
 Bobotago
 Bodomzor
 Boghiston
 Bogikalon
 Bokhtariyon
 Boshtol
 Bostondeh
 Bozorboy Burunov
 Bulok
 Buston
 Bustonqala

Top of page

C

 Chashma
 Chashmasor, Fayzobod District
 Chashmasor, Ghafurov District
 Chashmasor, Shahriston District
 Childara
 Chimqal'a
 Chinor
 Cholota
 Chorbogh
 Chore
 Chorqishloq
 Chorsu, Lakhsh District
 Chorsu, Vahdat
 Choruqdayrron
 Chukkat

Top of page

D

 Dadoboy Kholmatov
 Dahana, Asht District
 Dahana, Yaghnob
 Dahyak
 Dakhkat
 Darband
 Dardar
 Darg
 Dashti Amin
 Dashti-Jum
 Dashtiqozy
 Dehbaland
 Dehhisor
 Dehkalon
 Dehmalik
 Dehmanora
 Dehmoy
 Dehqonariq
 Dizhik
 Dombrachi
 Dulona
 Dumzoy
 Duvana

Top of page

E

 Esizi Poyon

Top of page

F

 Farkhor
 Farkov
 Farob
 Fatmev
 Fatmovut
 Fayzobod
 Filmandar
 Firdavsi
 Fondaryo

Top of page

G

 Galaba
 Ganji Nihon
 Gazantarak
 Gaznich
 Gazza
 Gharm
 Gharmayn
 Ghezani Bolo
 Ghezani-Poyon
 Ghonchi
 Ghulakandoz
 Gizhdarva
 Gudos
 Guliston
 Gulshan
 Gusar
 Guytan
 Guzaribad

Top of page

H

 Hadishahr
 Hakimi
 Hayoti Nav
 Hazora
 Hijborak
 Hoit
 Homid Aliev

Top of page

I

 Iftikhor
 Ishkoshim
 Iskodar
 Ismoili Somoni
 Ismoili Somoni, Sughd
 Ispan
 Istiqlol, Devashtich District
 Istiqlol, Shahriston District
 Izzatullo Halimov

Top of page

J

 Jafr
 Jangal
 Javkandak
 Jilav
 Jilikul
 Jomchashma
 Jomi
 Jura Rahmonov

Top of page

K

 Kalai Surkh
 Kalanak
 Kalon
 Kamar
 Kamar-Tash
 Kanchoch
 Kansi
 Kante
 Kanyshbek
 Kashi
 Kashot
 Kattasarqamish
 Kevron
 Khalifa Hassan
 Khayrobod, Ayni District
 Khayrobod, Kuhistoni Mastchoh District
 Khayronbed
 Khishortob
 Khistevarz
 Khoja Tohir
 Khonabad
 Khovaling
 Khudgifi Bolo
 Khumdon
 Khurmi
 Khurramobod, Tajikistan
 Khurramzamin
 Khushikat
 Kiblai
 Kiryonti
 Kishtudak
 Konsoy
 Korez
 Kuhi
 Kuhsor
 Kuloli
 Kumarg
 Kurush

Top of page

L

 Lakhsh
 Lakkon
 Langarishoh
 Lohur, Danghara District
 Lohuti
 Lolazor, Danghara District
 Lolazor, Devashtich District
 Lolazor, Jabbor Rasulov District
 Luchob

Top of page

M

 Marghtumayn
 Mehnatobod
 Mehrobod, Asht District
 Mehrobod, Fayzobod District
 Mirzo Tursunzoda
 Mujiharf
 Muk
 Muksu
 Mullomir
 Murghob
 Mushtif

Top of page

N

 Navbahor
 Navdi
 Navdonak
 Navkat
 Navobod, Istaravshan
 Navobod, Panjakent
 Navobod, Rasht District
 Nijoni
 Nofaroj
 Nomitkon
 Nurafshon
 Nushor
 Nusratullo Makhsum

Top of page

O

 Obi Mehnat
 Obigarm
 Obikiik
 Oboddara
 Obodi
 Obshoron
 Oftobruy
 Ozodagon

Top of page

P

 Padipast
 Pakhtaobod
 Paldorak
 Panj
 Panji Poyon
 Panjob
 Panjrud
 Petif
 Pildon
 Piniyon
 Piskon
 Ponghoz
 Porshinev
 Pulraut
 Punuk
 Pushing

Top of page

Q

 Qadamjo
 Qadiob
 Qal'acha
 Qalaibaland
 Qalaidasht
 Qal'ai Khumb
 Qalailabiob
 Qal'ai Mirzoboy
 Qaroqazon
 Qubodiyon
 Qul

Top of page

R

 Rabot
 Rahimzoda
 Rarz
 Ravshan
 Revad
 Roghun
 Romit
 Roshorv
 Roshtqal'a
 Rosrovut
 Rudaki
 Rushon

Top of page

S

 Safar Amirshoev
 Safedchashma
 Sangtuda
 Sangvor
 Sarazm
 Sarband
 Sargoy
 Sarikhosor
 Sarvan
 Sarvati Istiqlol
 Sayf Rahim
 Sebiston
 Sebzor
 Seshanbe
 Shahrinav
 Shakhsara
 Shamsobod
 Shamtuch
 Sharora
 Sharshara
 Shaydon
 Shing
 Shirinchashma
 Shogadoev
 Showeta
 Shurab
 Shuroobod
 Sicharogh
 Simich
 Simiganj
 Sirdaryo
 Sohibnazar
 Sokan
 Sokidara
 10-Solagii Istiqloliyat
 20-Solagii Istiqloliyati Tojikiston
 Sughdiyona
 Sujina
 Sultonobod
 Surkh
 Surkhob

Top of page

T

 Tagichinor
 Tagob
 Tagoba
 Takhtialif
 Tavildara
 Turdiev
 Tursunzoda

Top of page

U

 Ustanak
 Ustung
 Utkansu
 Utogar

Top of page

V

 Vagashton
 Vahdat, Gorno-Badakhshan
 Vahdat, Shahriston District
 Vakhsh, Jayhun District
 Vanj
 Varsaut
 Varzob
 Varzobqala
 Vashan
 Vashgird
 Ven
 Veshab
 Veshist
 Veshkand
 Vodif
 Vogat
 Voru
 Vota

Top of page

W

 Waghinzoy
 Witikhon

Top of page

Y

 Yakhtan
 Yakkakhona
 Yakkatol
 Yangi Shahr
 Yasman
 Yertula
 Yori
 Yova
 Yovon
 Yozghand

Top of page

Z

 Zafar
 Zamchorroha
 Zarafshan
 Zarchasma
 Zarhok
 Zarrinrud
 Zarzamin
 Zasun
 Zavron
 Zebon
 Zerobod
 Zideh
 Zimare
 Zimtut
 Zindakon

Top of page

Tajikistan

Tajikistan
Towns